Fine Feathers may refer to:
 The Fine Feathers  or Fine Feathers a 1912 silent short directed by Lois Weber
 Fine Feathers (1915 film)
 Fine Feathers (1921 film)
 Fine Feathers (1937 film)
 Fine Feathers (play), 1913 play by Eugene Walter